True Grit: A Further Adventure is a 1978 American Western television film directed by Richard T. Heffron. It is a sequel to True Grit (1969) and ''Rooster Cogburn (1975). While John Wayne  portrays Rooster Cogburn in the first two films, Warren Oates takes over the role in this 1978 TV version. Lisa Pelikan portrays Mattie Ross, played in the first film by Kim Darby.  The supporting cast features Lee Meriwether and Parley Baer.

Plot
The further adventures of U.S. Marshal Rooster Cogburn are told here. He battles criminals and injustice in his own unorthodox way. Meanwhile, he must also contend with the ever tough-as-nails Mattie Ross, a teenage girl hellbent on reforming him.

Cast
 Warren Oates as Reuben J. 'Rooster' Cogburn 
 Lisa Pelikan as Mattie Ross 
 Lee Meriwether as Annie Sumner 
 James Stephens as Joshua Sumner 
 Jeff Osterhage as Christopher Sumner   
 Lee Montgomery as Daniel Sumner 
 Ramon Bieri as Sheriff Ambrose 
 Jack Fletcher as Clerk 
 Parley Baer as Rollins 
 Lee de Broux as Skorby 
 Fredric Cook as Chaka 
 Redmond Gleeson as Harrison 
 Gregg Palmer as Slatter 
 Derrel Maury as Creed
 Roger Frazier as Moses Turk 
 John Perak as Tom Lacy 
 Don Spencer as Doc Wade 
 Burt Douglas as Bast
 Richard McKenzie 
 Simon Tyme as Udall  
 Sue Hoffman 
 Charles Burke as Hopkins

References

External links 
 

1978 television films
American Western (genre) television films
ABC network original films
Films directed by Richard T. Heffron
Paramount Pictures films
Further Adventure
Television sequel films
United States Marshals Service in fiction
1970s English-language films